Baisden is a surname. Notable people with the name include:

 Michael Baisden (born 1963), American nationally syndicated radio personality
 Harry Baisden (1893—1926), American composer
 Kendall Baisden (born 1995), American track and field sprinter